The 1993 Colorado State Rams football team represented Colorado State University in the Western Athletic Conference during the 1993 NCAA Division I-A football season. In their first season under head coach Sonny Lubick, the Rams compiled a 5–6 record.

Schedule

Roster

References

Colorado State
Colorado State Rams football seasons
Colorado State Rams football